St. Mary's is a community in the Republic of Trinidad and Tobago.  It is located in west-central Trinidad, and is administered by the Couva–Tabaquite–Talparo Regional Corporation.

References

Populated places in Trinidad and Tobago